SMS Frauenlob ("Praise of Women")  was a Prussian naval schooner. The first German naval vessel of that name, she was financed largely by voluntary contributions of German women following the German Revolution of 1848. The keel for Frauengabe (Women's gift) was laid down in 1849 and she was launched on 24 August 1855 in Wolgast as Frauenlob. She was commissioned on 1 May 1856. In 1859, Frauenlob participated in the Eulenburg Expedition and was lost on 2 September 1860 in a typhoon off Yokohama with all hands.

Design and construction
The Frauenlob was a clinker-built ship, the hull of which was made with a transverse frame and covered with copper plates for protection. She had gaff rigging on two masts with a total sail area of ​​523 m², which enabled a top speed of 13 knots.

The construction contract was given to the Wolgast shipyard in Lübke, which also drew up the construction plans. The construction costs of around 43,000 thalers were partly financed with the collected donations, the shortfall was subsidized by the War Ministry.

References

 

Ships of the Prussian Navy
Schooners
1855 ships
Ships built in Wolgast
Maritime incidents in September 1860
Warships lost with all hands
Shipwrecks in the Pacific Ocean
Shipwrecks of Japan
Germany–Japan relations